Terence "Terry" Suthers     is a British conservator, museum curator and director. He is a Deputy lieutenant for the County of West Yorkshire.

Career
Trained initially as a conservator and archaeology curator with Hull and East Riding Museum before benefiting from a Churchill Fellowship to study heritage restoration projects in Italy and North Africa.

Suthers was appointed curator of the Yorkshire Museum on 6 April 1983, succeeding Michael Clegg in the post. He was subsequently the assistant director and head of public services at the Science Museum, London, from 1987 to 1992, then executive director of Harewood House from 1992 to 2007, served for ten years as chairman of York Archaeological Trust (2007-2017), was a Trustee of York Museums Trust between 2002 and 2008, and is currently a vice chairman of Yorkshire Film Archive (2002–present).

In 2005 he was made a deputy lieutenant for the County of West Yorkshire and in 2012 was awarded the MBE for Services to the Heritage and Museums in Yorkshire.

Publications
Suthers, T. 1975. Hull old and new. Wakefield : EP Publishing.
Buddle, A. and Suthers, T. 1979. Cutting betel in style. Yorkshire and Humberside Museum and Art Gallery Service.
Suthers, T. 1984. "Conservation of Mosaics in Europe and North Africa", Annual Report of the Yorkshire Philosophical Society for the year 1983, York, Yorkshire Philosophical Society, 48–58.

References

British archaeologists
British curators
Yorkshire Museum people
Deputy Lieutenants of West Yorkshire
Members of the Order of the British Empire
Year of birth missing (living people)
Living people
Trustees of York Museums Trust